Edwardsium is a genus of crabs in the family Xanthidae, containing the following species:

 Edwardsium crockeri (Glassell, 1936)
 Edwardsium crosslandi (Finnegan, 1931)
 Edwardsium lobipes (Rathbun, 1898)
 Edwardsium spinimanum (H. Milne-Edwards, 1834)

References

Xanthoidea